Dominik Pagacz is a Canadian artist known mostly as an Emmy Award-winning motion picture supervising sound editor, sound effects editor, sound designer, sound re-recording mixer, actor and filmmaker.
He is a member of the Academy of Canadian Cinema and Television and of the Academy of Television Arts & Sciences (ATAS) (U.S.A.).

He is also the founding member and artistic director of the experimental theatre  and film production company Segment 3.

Filmography
 1990 A Bullet in the Head
 1992 La Fourmi et le volcan
 1995 Hiroshima
 1995 Bullet to Beijing
 1996 Midnight in Saint Petersburg
 1996 Omerta, la loi du silence
 1996 Marguerite Volant
 1996 The Ideal Man (L'Homme idéal)
 1997 The Absent One (L'Absent)
 1997 Stowaways (Clandestins)
 1998 The Red Violin (Le Violon rouge)
 1998 L'Ombre de l'épervier
 1999 The Old Man and the Sea
 1999 Gladys
 2000 The Orphan Muses (Les Muses orphelines)
 2001 Tar Angel (L'Ange de goudron)
 2001 Games of the Heart (Du pic au cœur)
 2001 A Girl at the Window (Une jeune fille à la fenêtre)
 2002 Katryn's Place
 2003 Seducing Doctor Lewis (La grande séduction)
 2003 Music Hall
 2003 Gisèle 
 2009 Angel at Sea (Un ange à la mer)
 2010 The Pillars of the Earth

Awards

Nominations & Wins *
 2011 : Emmy Awards Outstanding Sound Editing for a Mini-series, Movie or Special — The Pillars of the Earth
 2010 : Jutra Awards Best Sound — Angel at Sea (Un ange à la mer)
 2003 : Gémeaux Awards Best Sound — Music Hall
 2002 : Genie Awards Best Achievement in Sound Editing — A Girl at the Window (Une jeune fille à la fenêtre)
 2002 : Jutra Awards Best Sound — A Girl at the Window (Une jeune fille à la fenêtre)
 2001 : Jutra Awards Best Sound — The Orphan Muses (Les Muses orphelines))
 2000 : Gémeaux Awards Best Achievement in Overall Sound — L'Ombre de l'épervier
 1998 : Gémeaux Awards Best Achievement in Overall Sound — L'Ombre de l'épervier

References

External links
 

Living people
Artists from Montreal
Canadian sound designers
Canadian experimental filmmakers
Year of birth missing (living people)